Yerraguntla is town and Nagar Panchayat in YSR Kadapa District. It is an industrial area in YSR Kadapa district, Andhra Pradesh. It is located in Yerraguntla mandal of Kadapa revenue division.

Geography
Yerraguntla is located at 7GJ5+XJ9 Yerraguntla, Andhra Pradesh

Demographics

The total population constitute,  males,  females and  children, in the age group of 0–6 years. The average literacy rate stands at 70.56% with  literates, lower than the national average of 73.00%.

Transport
 is a junction for Nandyal–Yerraguntla section and Guntakal–Chennai Egmore section. It falls under the jurisdiction of Guntakal railway division and is one of the 'D'-category station in the division.

Governance

Civic administration

Yerraguntla Nagar Panchayat is the civic administrative body of the town which was constituted in the year 2012.

Education
The primary and secondary school education is imparted by government, aided and private schools, under the School Education Department of the state.

See also 
List of census towns in Andhra Pradesh

References

External links

Cities and towns in Kadapa district